FC Khimki-M is a Russian football club based in Khimki. It acts as the reserve-team for FC Khimki.

History
The club was founded in 1997 and played at amateur level until the start of the 2018–19 season when it was licensed to play in the third-tier Russian Professional Football League.

Current squad
As of 22 February 2023, according to the Second League website.

References

External links
Team history by FootballFacts

Association football clubs established in 1997
FC Khimki
1997 establishments in Russia